Mujahid Colony is a neighborhood in the Karachi Central district of Karachi, Pakistan.It is part of Liaquatabad Town & is one of the largest UC of Liaquatabad Town.

Demography
The ethnic groups in Mujahid Colony include Pashtuns, Muhajir, Punjabis, Kashmiris, Seraikis, Sindhis, Balochs, Brahuis, Memons etc.

References

External links 
 Karachi website.

Neighbourhoods of Karachi